In geometry, the truncated tetraoctagonal tiling is a semiregular tiling of the hyperbolic plane. There are one square, one octagon, and one hexakaidecagon on each vertex.  It has Schläfli symbol of tr{8,4}.

Dual tiling

Symmetry

There are 15 subgroups constructed from [8,4] by mirror removal and alternation. Mirrors can be removed if its branch orders are all even, and cuts neighboring branch orders in half. Removing two mirrors leaves a half-order gyration point where the removed mirrors met. In these images fundamental domains are alternately colored black and white, and mirrors exist on the boundaries between colors. The subgroup index-8 group, [1+,8,1+,4,1+] (4242) is the commutator subgroup of [8,4].

A larger subgroup is constructed as [8,4*], index 8, as [8,4+], (4*4) with gyration points removed, becomes (*4444) or (*44), and another [8*,4], index 16 as [8+,4], (8*2) with gyration points removed as (*22222222) or (*28). And their direct subgroups [8,4*]+, [8*,4]+, subgroup indices 16 and 32 respectively, can be given in orbifold notation as (4444) and (22222222).

Related polyhedra and tilings 

From a Wythoff construction there are fourteen hyperbolic uniform tilings that can be based from the regular order-4 octagonal tiling.

Drawing the tiles colored as red on the original faces, yellow at the original vertices, and blue along the original edges, there are 7 forms with full [8,4] symmetry, and 7 with subsymmetry.

See also 

 Tilings of regular polygons
 List of uniform planar tilings

References
 John H. Conway, Heidi Burgiel, Chaim Goodman-Strass, The Symmetries of Things 2008,  (Chapter 19, The Hyperbolic Archimedean Tessellations)

External links 

 Hyperbolic and Spherical Tiling Gallery
 KaleidoTile 3: Educational software to create spherical, planar and hyperbolic tilings
 Hyperbolic Planar Tessellations, Don Hatch

Hyperbolic tilings
Isogonal tilings
Semiregular tilings
Truncated tilings